Death of  Louis Jean Pierre Vieillot
Christian Ludwig Brehm publishes  Handbuch der Naturgeschichte alle Vögel Deutschlands
Second voyage of HMS Beagle commences
Adolphe Delattre makes the first of several trips to South America.
Johann Friedrich von Brandt  appointed director of the Zoological Department at the St Petersburg Academy of Sciences
Nicholas Aylward Vigors describes the great Indian bustard
"Maison Deyrolle" established in Paris.
Birding and ornithology by year
1831 in science